Amir Amizis Soto Espinoza (born 4 November 1997) is a Panamanian professional footballer.

Early life
Soto was born in Panama City, Panama. In 2018, he signed with Danish 2nd Division side Ringkøbing.

Club career

Universitario
In 2019, Soto returned to Panama and played for Liga Panameña side Universitario, making ten appearances.

Valour FC
On 7 February 2020, Soto signed with Canadian Premier League side Valour FC. On 30 June 2021, he made his debut as a substitute in a 2–0 win over HFX Wanderers. In January 2022 Valour announced that Soto was departing the club.

International career
In late 2018, Soto received his first call-up to the Panama national team for a friendly against Venezuela, but did not appear in the match.

References

External links

1997 births
Living people
Association football defenders
Panamanian footballers
Sportspeople from Panama City
Panamanian expatriate footballers
Expatriate men's footballers in Denmark
Panamanian expatriate sportspeople in Denmark
Expatriate soccer players in Canada
Panamanian expatriate sportspeople in Canada
Ringkøbing IF players
Unión Deportivo Universitario players
Valour FC players
Liga Panameña de Fútbol players
Canadian Premier League players